Aristoi Classical Academy is a K-12 open-enrollment public charter school based in Katy, Texas. The school opened in 1996 as West Houston Charter School, with an emphasis on fine arts. In 2006, the student population declined with many unfilled seats. After careful deliberation, the school's board of directors voted to transition to a classical school model, an educational option previously available only in area private schools. The school currently has three campuses, two of which serve a portion of the Katy Independent School District area, and the remaining serves the Cypress Fairbanks Independent School District area.

History
Aristoi Classical Academy in Katy, Texas is a second-generation public charter school in its 23rd year of operations as of 2019. The school opened in 1996 as "West Houston Charter School" with an emphasis on fine arts. In 2006, there were many unfilled seats. The school's K-8 enrollment was under 200 students. The original model focused on catering to each student's preferred learning style or styles, with different content for auditory, kinesthetic, and visual learners, respectively.

After careful deliberation, the school's board of directors voted to transition to a classical school model, an educational option previously available only in area private schools. Enrollment began to increase as families began to seek a tuition-free classical education. In 2010, the school's name was changed.

"Aristoi" (ἄριστος) is a Greek term referring to nobility. The school's mission is to "provide students with an academically challenging Classical Liberal Arts education that encourages them to develop a passion for learning that gives them the means to become responsible citizens of virtuous character." ACA uses the trivium to organize the stages of learning based on a child's natural stages of intellectual development. The grammar stage (K-4th grade) aims to provide a thorough foundation in phonics, spelling, grammar, literature, vocabulary, history, biology, and basic mathematics. The logic stage (5th-8th grade) focuses on higher-level mathematics and the application of logic to all subjects (e.g., paragraph construction, thesis writing, textual analyses, the scientific method, and historical questions). In addition, the rudimentary skills necessary in logical argument and debate are fostered in this stage. In the rhetoric stage (9th-12th grades), students learn to write at a collegiate level, speak eloquently, and defend original ideas. One of main purposes of this stage is to make public speaking second-nature. Seniors write and publicly defend a thesis as a requirement of graduation.

The open-enrollment charter school has become enormously popular in the Katy community. Once permission to add a high school was granted by the state, 9th grade was added in 2014, with a new grade level added each subsequent year. The 2016-17 school year opened with 761 students in grades K-11 and a waiting list totaling 258. In 2018, ACA celebrated its first graduating class.

ACA students scored impressively on the 2016 STAAR test. In high school, for example, 100% of ACA students earned Level II (satisfactory) scores for English I, compared to 62% statewide. Similarly, ACA scores for Algebra 1, Biology, and English II were 93%, 95%, and 90%, respectively, compared to statewide scores of 68%, 49%, and 63%. The school outgrew its small campus in historic Katy and had to lease additional space to serve the growing student body. Therefore, 22.16 acres of land was purchased on Morton Road (Katy) to build a K-12 campus. The first phase included a multipurpose facility with a gymnasium, stage, offices, restrooms, locker rooms, an adjacent kitchen and service area, and three modular buildings with space for twelve classrooms each. An athletic field being constructed on the northeast corner of the property will be used for sports and physical education programs.

Limitations of charter school funding create financial challenges that traditional public schools do not face. For example, charter schools receive less funding per student as they are ineligible for local tax revenue, and they receive zero funding for facilities. Thus, ACA must rely on philanthropic support in its ambitious efforts to provide children in Katy and West Houston with a classical education and suitable learning environment.

In May 2019, Brenda Davidson, the school's superintendent, announced Dr. Terrence O. Moore as the new Headmaster after Matthew Watson serving in the position for five years to develop the high school. On October 18, 2019, Dr. Moore “tendered his resignation” as Headmaster. Kathryn Locheed took his place as the interim Head of Upper School.

Campus
Aristoi Classical Academy has two campuses. Aristoi's Main Campus (5618 Eleventh St.) houses the school's elementary grades—Kindergarten through 4th Grade. The Morton Road Campus (5610 Morton Rd.) houses 5th through 12th Grades, and the district offices.

On December 21, 2018, it was announced that Aristoi will create a campus based in Crossover Bible Fellowship as an effort expand into the Cypress-Fairbanks Independent School District area.

Curriculum
Aristoi Classical Academy uses a classical curriculum.

The substance of the curriculum traces its roots to ancient Greece and Rome, the civilizations that Aristoi sees as the first to systematically explore the meaning of human existence. The school sees the literature, poetry, philosophy, and political experience of those ancient cultures serve as the foundation of Western civilization and form the basis of classical education. The classical education Aristoi employs aims to recognize “the experiences of historical peoples and societies as a rich source of wisdom for the present."

With the exception of Latin, much of the scope and sequence cited below is taken from the Core Knowledge Sequence—not to be confused with the Common Core standards prohibited in Texas schools. As a public charter school, Aristoi also teaches all subjects and topics required by the State of Texas. For example, while all public schools are required to offer basic "social studies," ACA offers that as required in addition to an expanded history of the world and the United States in all grades. This is the classical education method of covering an important subject the school believes is at the depth appropriate for the child's development. Younger students learn basic facts—such as when the Civil War was fought a who fought—while older students learn comprehensive details, such as why the Civil War was fought and how it shaped America's future.

Dress-Code

Students in grades K-5 wear gray or yellow polo shirts, navy bottoms, white socks and solid-white tennis shoes. In grades 6-8, students wear gray or yellow polo shirts, navy bottoms, and black dress shoes. High school students wear white shirts (polo or button-down), navy or khaki bottoms, and black dress shoes.  On Fridays, students may wear school-approved spirit-wear and tennis shoes. The detailed dress code policy can be found at this link: Aristoi Classical Academy - Student Dress Code.

The school has casual dress guidelines on days that it is offered. These are typically at the end of each quarter, if the student has had no dress code violations in said quarter. They are also sold on select months for one day.

See also
List of state-operated charter schools in Houston
Aristoi

References

External links
 Aristoi Classical Academy
NCES Report on Aristoi

Charter K-12 schools in Texas
Katy, Texas
1996 establishments in Texas
Educational institutions established in 1996
K-12 schools in Harris County, Texas
Public high schools in Harris County, Texas
Public schools in Harris County, Texas
Classical educational institutes